John Sheldon may refer to:

John Sheldon (anatomist) (1752–1808), English surgeon
John Sheldon (racing driver) (born 1946), a British former racing driver.
John Sheldon (trade unionist), English trade union leader.
John Sheldon (Wisconsin politician) (1865–1933), American politician
Jackie Sheldon (1887–1943), English footballer.

See also 
Jack Sheldon
John Shelton (disambiguation)
Sheldon John
 Sheldon (name)